Beyond the Mist is the debut album by a quartet co-led by two Danish jazz musicians: saxophonist Lotte Anker and pianist Mette Petersen, which was recorded in 1989 and released on the Danish Stunt label.

Reception

The Penguin Guide to Jazz notes that the album "is well worth searching out, not least for the interplay between two of the most interesting female performers in European free jazz. The improvisations here are well centred and almost earthy in impact, contrary to any false impression ´mist' may have given."

In a review for Wondering Sound, Charles Farrell says "Beyond the Mist is genuinely interactive quartet music: The players are all integral to its success, contributing to the common language. Each also manages to establish a strong individual voice along the way."

Track listing
 "Beyond the Mist" (Lotte Anker/Mette Petersen) – 2:56
 "Guardian" (Mette Petersen) – 6:36
 "Månegal" (Mette Petersen) – 8:06
 "Februar" (Lotte Anker) – 4:58
 "Syeeda's Song Flute" (John Coltrane)– 8:44
 "Flossing" (Lotte Anker) – 8:24
 "Pieces of My Master's Pieces" (Mette Petersen) – 5:19

Personnel
Lotte Anker – soprano sax
Mette Petersen – piano
Jesper Lundgaard –  bass
Jens Jefsen – bass on 7
Jesper Elén – drums

References

1989 albums
Lotte Anker albums